

Australia

 Norfolk Island
 Administrator – Robert Nixon Dalkin, Administrator of Norfolk Island (1968–1972)
 Head of Government – William M. Randall, President of the Island Council of Norfolk Island (1967–1974)
 Papua and New Guinea
 High Commissioner – David Hay, High Commissioner in Papua and New Guinea (1966–1970)

France
 Afars and Issas
 Commissioner – 
 Louis Saget, High Commissioner of the Afars and Issas (1967–1969)
 Dominique Ponchardier, High Commissioner of the Afars and Issas (1969–1971)
 Governing Council – Ali Aref Bourhan, President of the Governing Council (1967–1976)

Portugal
 Angola – Camilo Augusto de Miranda Rebocho Vaz, High Commissioner of Angola (1966–1972)

United Kingdom
 Antigua
Governor – Sir Wilfred Jacobs, Governor of Antigua (1967–1993)
Premier – Vere Bird, Premier of Antigua (1960–1971)
 Bahama Islands
Governor – Francis Hovell-Thurlow-Cumming-Bruce, Baron Thurlow, Governor of the Bahama Islands (1968–1972)
Prime Minister – Lynden Pindling, Prime Minister of the Bahama Islands (1967–1992)

Colonial governors
Colonial governors
1969